Christopher Read (born 1946) is a British historian of the Soviet Union.

Works 
 Religion, Revolution and The Russian Intelligentsia (1979)
 Culture and Power in Revolutionary Russia (1990)
 From Tsar to Soviets: The Russian People and Their Revolution (1996)
 The Making and Breaking of the Soviet System: An Interpretation (2001)
 The Stalin Years: A Reader (2003)
 Lenin: A Revolutionary Life (2005)
 War and Revolution in Russia: 1914–22, The Collapse of Tsarism and the Establishment of Soviet Power (2013)

References

External links 
 

Living people

1946 births
British historians
Historians of the Soviet Union